Chiloschista phyllorhiza, commonly known as the white starfish orchid, is a species of leafless epiphytic or lithophytic orchid that forms small clumps with many radiating, flattened green roots. A large number of short-lived, crystalline white, star-shaped flowers with a yellow labellum are arranged along thin, arching flowering stems. It occurs in northern parts of Australia where it grows in rainforest, swamps and near streams.

Description 
The side lobes are erect and the middle lobe is small and densely hairy. Flowering occurs from November to February but the flowers open sporadically in groups and only last for one or two days.

Taxonomy and naming
The white starfish orchid was first formally described in 1866 by Ferdinand von Mueller who gave it the name Sarcochilus phyllorhizus and published the description in Fragmenta phytographiae Australiae. In 1921, Rudolf Schlechter changed the name to Chiloschista phyllorhiza. The specific epithet (phyllorhiza) is derived from the Ancient Greek words phyllon meaning "leaf" and rhiza meaning "root".

Distribution and habitat
The white starfish orchid grows on trees near the edge of rainforest, on sheltered ridges, in swamps and near streams. It is found in the north of the Northern Territory, on some Torres Strait Islands and on Cape York Peninsula as far south as the Tully River.

References

phyllorhiza
Orchids of the Northern Territory
Orchids of Queensland
Endemic orchids of Australia
Plants described in 1866
Taxa named by Ferdinand von Mueller